Fanfan Ndala Monga (born 11 April 1986) is a Congolese football goalkeeper who plays for Lusaka Dynamos F.C.

References 

1986 births
Living people
Democratic Republic of the Congo footballers
Democratic Republic of the Congo international footballers
Association football goalkeepers
Democratic Republic of the Congo expatriate footballers
Expatriate footballers in Zambia
Democratic Republic of the Congo expatriate sportspeople in Zambia
FC Saint-Éloi Lupopo players
Kabwe Warriors F.C. players
Lusaka Dynamos F.C. players
Democratic Republic of the Congo A' international footballers
2011 African Nations Championship players